Stirum is an unincorporated community in northwestern Sargent County, North Dakota, United States.  It lies a short distance to the south of North Dakota Highway 13, northwest of the city of Forman, the county seat of Sargent County.  Its elevation is 1,355 feet (413 m).  It has a post office with the ZIP code 58069.

References

External links
Stirum Diamond Jubilee, 1907-1982: August 21-22, 1982, Stirum, N.D. from the Digital Horizons website

Unincorporated communities in Sargent County, North Dakota
Unincorporated communities in North Dakota